Hugo Pastor Corro (November 5, 1953 – June 15, 2007), better known plainly as Hugo Corro, was an Argentine former professional boxer who held the undisputed middleweight championship between April 1978 and June 1979.

Corro beat Rodrigo Valdez for the world middleweight title, and he would beat Valdez in a rematch. Valdez had succeeded Carlos Monzón as world champion. Since Monzon had beaten Valdez twice also during his period as champion, the comparisons between Corro and Monzon became inevitable. The fact that Corro went to Europe to defend his title was another common trait he shared with Monzon. Corro's championship reign would ultimately prove to be inferior to Monzon's however, as Corro defended his title successfully only twice, and Monzon retained the crown for a then record of fourteen times.

Professional career
Hugo Corro began fighting as a professional on August 30, 1973, with a sixth round knockout victory against Gustavo Dieff in the Argentine city of Tunuyan. His first ten bouts as a professional were held in Tunuyan. He had a draw (tie) against Pedro Pablo Bazan during his second fight, held on September 15, 16 days after his debut.

Corro reeled off three consecutive knockout wins, then faced Bazan in a rematch, on December 7. On his last fight of 1973, Corro was declared winner when Bazan was disqualified in the fourth round.

Corro won one more fight, and then, he fought ten rounds for the first time in his career, when he defeated Ramon Roberts by a ten-round decision on February 6, 1974. After another victory, he fought Juan Carlos Artaza on July 17. From a status standpoint, the fight had little significance, since Artaza only had two previous bouts, and he had lost both of them. But this was Corro's first fight outside Tunuyan. He beat Artaza by a ten-round decision in San Juan.

After one more win, he faced Hugo Saavedra, then a well established middleweight contender, on November 11. Saavedra gave Corro his first defeat, when he knocked out the future champion in the eighth round.

Corro rebounded with a sixth-round knockout win over Hugo Obregon on March 7, 1975. That marked the beginning of a thirteen fight winning streak, which included a rematch with Roberts, knocked out in six on July 4, two more fights with Obregon, both of which ended with Corro winning ten-round decisions, a victory by decision in ten against Norberto Cabrera, and two more fights against Saavedra.

His first rematch with Saavedra, on September 27, marked Corro's Buenos Aires debut. Corro was able to avenge his first defeat when he outpointed Saavedra over ten rounds. Their third bout, held on March 5, 1976 at Córdoba, ended when Saavedra was disqualified in the tenth round.

After a win against Roque Roldan, Corro met Norberto Cabrera for a second time. On May 21, he lost to Cabrera by a ten-round decision, in Buenos Aires. Corro, however, once again bounced back well, winning his next seven fights by knockout, including a rematch with Juan Carlos Artaza, who was beaten in round ten on September 10.

On December 10, he got his first shot at a title, when he fought Julio Medina for the vacant Argentine middleweight title. Corro won the national championship by knocking Medina out in round three of a fight that was scheduled for twelve rounds.

After two victories over Rodolfo Rosales, Corro had his first fight abroad, boxing against Marcelo Quinones on May 9, 1977, for the South American middleweight title, in Lima, Peru. He conquered the continental championship by decisioning Quinones over twelve rounds. The win also earned him a spot among the world's top ten middleweight challengers for the first time.

Corro followed that win with seven more victories, including title defenses of both his Argentine and his South American middleweight titles, before he got his first opportunity at becoming world champion: on April 22, 1978, Corro became the undisputed world middleweight champion by beating Valdez by a fifteen-round decision in Italy.

His first world title defense came against Ronnie Harris, on August 5, back in Argentina. He outpointed Harris over fifteen rounds, and then, on November 11, he retained the title in his rematch with Valdez, by a fifteen-round decision at Buenos Aires.

He traveled to Monte Carlo, where Monzon defended his title a few times, to face Vito Antuofermo for his third world title defense. Corro lost the title on June 30 of 1979 in a fight that was actually held at Monaco's royal palace. Corro in reality lost his title by only one point, as Antuofermo beat him by a split decision, and each judge had a one-point difference on their scorecard (scores of 146-145, 145-146 and 142-143). Asked about the fight during the press conference that followed it, Corro answered "I only had one problem, his head". By saying this, he meant that he felt Antuofermo butted him many times during the contest.

After winning one more fight and losing another one, Corro decided to retire for the first time in 1981. Inspired by the relative success of his much younger brother Osvaldo, a contender during the late 1980s, however, Hugo attempted a comeback during 1988. He made some headlines after winning his first two bouts, but he lost three of his next four bouts, with one draw. On September 16 of '88 he lost to another famous Argentine boxer, Juan Roldán, by knockout in round one. After losing by knockout in four rounds to Hugo Antonio Corti on February 17 of 1989, Corro retired from boxing for good.

Corro had one fight in Chile. He never boxed in the United States as a professional.

Corro had a record of 50 wins, 7 losses and 2 draws as a professional boxer, with 29 wins by way of knockout. On June 15, 2007, he died after suffering from an acute liver disease.

Professional boxing record

See also
List of world middleweight boxing champions

References

External links

Hugo Corro - CBZ Profile

 

|-

|-

1953 births
2007 deaths
Argentine male boxers
Sportspeople from Mendoza Province
Deaths from liver disease
Middleweight boxers
World middleweight boxing champions
World Boxing Association champions
World Boxing Council champions
The Ring (magazine) champions